Peter Berger may refer to:

Peter Berger (rower) (born 1949), German Olympic rower 
Peter Berger (Royal Navy officer) (1925–2003), British admiral
Peter B. Berger (born 1956), American cardiologist and researcher
Peter E. Berger (1944–2011), American film editor
Peter L. Berger (1929–2017), Austrian-born American sociologist and Lutheran theologian

See also
 Peter Berg (born 1964), American film director
 Peter Bergen (born 1962), American journalist
 Peter Burger (born 1954), Swiss pentathlete